Pietro Scalia (born March 17, 1960) is an Italian–American film editor. He won Best Film Editing at the 64th Academy Awards for his work on the film JFK, sharing the award with Joe Hutshing, and at the 74th Academy Awards for Black Hawk Down.

Life and career
He was born in Catania, Sicily and later he moved to Switzerland with his parents. There, he attended Swiss-German schools until high school. After graduation, he decided to move to the United States to pursue his college education. He spent two years at the University at Albany, The State University of New York, after which he was accepted as an undergraduate at UCLA. The Swiss government's scholarship helped him through five years of UCLA and in 1985 he earned his Master of Fine Arts from the UCLA Film School.

After his MFA, a couple of short films, a screenplay, two video documentaries, and a 16 mm thesis film, he returned to Europe to pursue his desire to become a film director. Shortly afterwards, he returned to United States on a work visa to pursue his career in Hollywood as a film editor. He began as an editor on Andrei Konchalovski's Shy People. Later, he received an assistant editor position working with Oliver Stone. However, it was not easy to get the job. Scalia admired Oliver Stone's work, especially Salvador, so he decided he wanted to work with that director. He got a contact through the sister of one of the assistant editors. Scalia worked on such films as Wall Street (1987) and Talk Radio (1988). He later continued as an associate editor on Born on the Fourth of July and as an additional editor on The Doors.

After five years of working with Oliver Stone, Scalia was finally asked to fully edit a film. It was JFK, for which Scalia and his co-editor, Joe Hutshing, were honored with an Academy Award for Film Editing. Craig McKay was nominated the same year for editing The Silence of the Lambs. Scalia edited a sequel to the movie, Hannibal ten years later. He also received a BAFTA Award and A.C.E. Award for his work.

Pietro Scalia worked with Bernardo Bertolucci on Little Buddha (1993) and Stealing Beauty (1996), as well as with Sam Raimi on The Quick and the Dead (1995). He earned two more Academy Award nominations: first in 1997 for Good Will Hunting and second in 2000 for Gladiator, and a second Academy Award for director Ridley Scott's Black Hawk Down. He also edited G.I. Jane and a pilot episode of a TV series American Gothic in late 1990s.

In the recent years, Scalia edited such movies as Levity (2003) directed by Ed Solomon, a documentary entitled Ashes and Snow, The Great Raid directed by John Dahl, and Memoirs of a Geisha, one of the most publicized movies of 2005, directed by Rob Marshall. Scalia also worked on Hannibal Rising, a movie that tells a story of a teenaged Hannibal and his young sister Mischa Lecter after their parents are killed in World War II. It was directed by Peter Webber and released in 2006. He has a long lasting relationship with Ridley Scott working on movies such as American Gangster in 2007, Body of Lies in 2008 and Robin Hood in 2010. Most recently he worked with director Ridley Scott on The Martian, released in October 2015. In May 2017, Scalia replaced editor Chris Dickens on the film Solo: A Star Wars Story, which was released in May 2018.

He lives in Los Angeles with his wife Teresa Sparks and two children, Julian and Maia Scalia.

Filmography
As film editor:

 1990 Megaville
 1991 JFK
 1992 Jackpot
 1993 Little Buddha
 1995 The Quick and the Dead
 1995 American Gothic (TV pilot, first cut)
 1996 Stealing Beauty
 1997 G.I. Jane
 1997 Good Will Hunting
 1998 The Big Hit
 1998 Playing by Heart
 2000 Gladiator
 2001 Hannibal
 2001 Black Hawk Down
 2003 Levity
 2003 Masked and Anonymous
 2005 Ashes and Snow
 2005 The Great Raid
 2005 Memoirs of a Geisha
 2007 American Gangster
 2007 Hannibal Rising
 2007 The 11th Hour
 2008 Body of Lies
 2009 40 Years of Silence: An Indonesian Tragedy
 2010 Robin Hood
 2010 Kick-Ass
 2012 The Amazing Spider-Man
 2012 Prometheus
 2013 The Counselor
 2014 The Amazing Spider-Man 2
 2015 Child 44
 2015 The Sea of Trees
 2015 The Martian
 2016 13 Hours: The Secret Soldiers of Benghazi
 2017 Alien: Covenant
 2018 Solo: A Star Wars Story
 2022 Morbius (Also associate producer)
 2022 Ambulance
 2022 The Gray Man
 2023 Ferrari

Oscars and Oscar nominations
1992 – JFK (won w/ co-editor, Joe Hutshing)
1998 – Good Will Hunting (nominated)
2001 – Gladiator (nominated)
2002 – Black Hawk Down (won)

References

External links

Filmed BAFTA event with Pietro Scala, July 2009

1960 births
Living people
Film people from Catania
American Cinema Editors
Best Editing BAFTA Award winners
Best Film Editing Academy Award winners
Italian film editors
Italian emigrants to the United States
American film editors